Forgiveness is a 2004 South African drama film dealing with the effects of the apartheid system and the difficulty of reconciliation. It was directed by Ian Gabriel and stars Arnold Vosloo, Zane Meas, Quanita Adams and Denise Newman.

Plot
Tertius Coetzee, a young South African Police constable during apartheid, is granted amnesty by the Truth and Reconciliation Commission for torturing and killing a Coloured ANC activist. Haunted by his brutal past, Coetzee travels to a West Coast fishing village to find the man's family and eventually ask their forgiveness.

Cast
 Arnold Vosloo as Tertius Coetzee
 Quanita Adams as Sannie Grootboom
 Christo Davids as Ernest Grootboom
 Zane Meas as Hendrik Grootboom

Reception
The New York Times remarked that 'Gabriel's sluggish direction is offset by atmospheric visuals that transform water droplets into glass beads and the ocean into an oily canvas speckled with bobbing gulls. Shooting on high-definition digital video, Giulio Biccari bleaches the coastline to a dusty gray, mirroring the characters’ motives and adding weight to a script that's frustratingly cagey.' Slant Magazine gave the film two stars and questioned its structure, saying, 'No one will accuse Gabriel of pushing a glossy commentary about reparations in South Africa, only a shabby melodrama. Ultimately, the film's stilted design is more transparent than clever, for which there shouldn't be any excuse.'

Forgiveness has won awards at both the Locarno International Film Festival and the Cape Town International Film Festival.

References

External links
Forgiveness official website

Forgiveness at allmovie
Forgiveness at Rotten Tomatoes

Apartheid films
2004 films
Afrikaans-language films
English-language South African films
2000s political drama films
Films shot in South Africa
South African drama films
2004 drama films
Truth and Reconciliation Commission (South Africa)